The 1981–82 international cricket season was from September 1981 to April 1982.

Season overview

November

Pakistan in Australia

1981–82 Benson & Hedges World Series

England in India

December

West Indies in Australia

February

England in Sri Lanka

Australia in New Zealand

March

Sri Lanka in Pakistan

References

International cricket competitions by season
1981 in cricket
1982 in cricket